Mahammad Mirzabeyov (born 16 November 1990) is a Russian-Azerbaijani professional football player of Dargin descent who plays for Sabail.

Career

Club

Russia
Mirzabeyov made his professional debut for Anzhi Makhachkala on 14 July 2010 against FC Pskov-747 Pskov.

Azerbaijan
On 30 May 2014, Mirzabeyov signed a one-year contract with Inter Baku.

In June 2015, Mirzabeyov signed for Gabala FK, leaving the club two-years later in May 2017.

Neftchi Baku confirmed Mirzabeyov's release after two-years with the club on 15 May 2019.

International

National youth teams of Russia
He won with the over U-18 and U-19 teams, against Iraq and Iran.

Azerbaijan
He was called up to the Azerbaijan, won goals on matches against France.

Career statistics

Club

International

Statistics accurate as of match played 26 March 2017

References

External links
 
 

1990 births
Footballers from Makhachkala
Living people
Azerbaijani footballers
Azerbaijan international footballers
Azerbaijani expatriate footballers
Russian footballers
Russian Premier League players
FC Anzhi Makhachkala players
Russian people of Dagestani descent
Sumgayit FK players
Shamakhi FK players
Gabala FC players
Sabah FC (Azerbaijan) players
Azerbaijan Premier League players
Russian expatriate footballers
Expatriate footballers in Azerbaijan
Association football defenders
FC Torpedo Moscow players
Neftçi PFK players
Sabail FK players